John Taylor was a United States Representative from South Carolina. His birth date is unknown. Taylor was a member of the South Carolina House of Representatives, 1802–1805. He was elected as a Republican to the Fourteenth Congress (March 4, 1815 – March 3, 1817) but was an unsuccessful candidate for reelection to the Fifteenth Congress in 1816 and for election to the Seventeenth Congress in 1820. His death date is unknown.

He married Mary Margaret Smith, the daughter of South Carolina Senator William Smith. Their daughter, Mary Margaret Smith Taylor, married journalist and planter Meredith Calhoun.

References

External links

Democratic-Republican Party members of the United States House of Representatives from South Carolina